Cazenove may refer to:
Antoine Charles Cazenove (1775–1852), Swiss-American businessman and diplomat
Arnold Cazenove (1898–1969), British Army officer
Christopher Cazenove (1943-2010), British actor
Theophilus Cazenove (1740-1811), financier and one of the agents of the Holland Land Company
Cazenove (stock broker), British stockbroker (firm)
Cazenove (ward), a ward in the London Borough of Hackney

See also

Casnovia (disambiguation)
Cazenovia (disambiguation)